Aksel Frederik Andersen (10 February 1891 Fodby, Denmark – 1972 Gentofte, Denmark) was a Danish mathematician who worked on infinite series and in particular on Cesàro summation.

References

Danish mathematicians
1891 births
1972 deaths